Le Roi Soleil is a French musical about the life of Louis XIV (played by Emmanuel Moire). It premiered on 22 September 2005 at the Palais des Sports in Paris.

Plot
The play begins with the Fronde against Cardinal Mazarin. Young Louis is the consecrated King at Reims. But his power has been confiscated by his mother, Anne of Austria, and the Cardinal, who doubt his ability to rule France alone.

Louis falls in love with Marie Mancini, an Italian emigrant without noble birth, niece of Cardinal Mazarin. To prove himself as a man, the young monarch decides to leave for the war at the head of his armies, and though Marie has a worrying premonition she is unable to stop him. Louis falls in battle, victim to a serious disease, and for a long time is believed dead. The court forgets him and attempts to name his brother Philippe the new King of France. Marie, however, refuses to accept his fate and spends many nights by his bedside praying in tears.

Then, in a sudden turn of events, one of the royal doctors administers a drug that wakes Louis from his sleep. He learns that he has been forgotten by everyone in the country except Marie and his own family. Now desperately in love with the beautiful Italian, Louis proposes to her. Marie reminds him that it is impossible for a French king to marry an Italian not of noble birth. Anne of Austria, Mazarin and even the Pope would object.

Louis stubbornly dismisses all opposition, declaring that he is King and will therefore decide his own future. Nevertheless, Anne of Austria and Mazarin put an end to the dream by banishing Marie into exile and persuading the young King to marry the Spanish princess. The first act ends with the pain of separation.

The second Act begins with the death of Mazarin, upon which Louis seizes power and becomes the Sun King.  He loses himself in the arms of many women, forgetting that his people will pay heavy taxes for the construction of an excessive dream - the Château de Versailles.

After many events such as the matter of the Man in the Iron Mask and the Poison Affair, Louis attains what he could not achieve with Marie Mancini. He marries, despite opposition, Françoise d'Aubigné, Marquise de Maintenon, a woman without noble birth who was the governess of his illegitimate children with Françoise-Athénaïs, marquise de Montespan.

The final performances of this play were on 6–8 July 2007 in Paris.

Cast
Louis XIV: Emmanuel Moire.
Marie Mancini: Anne-Laure Girbal.
Monsieur, the King's brother: Christophe Maé.
Françoise d'Aubigné: Cathialine Andria.
The Duc de Beaufort: Merwan Rim.
Isabelle, the representative of the people: Victoria Petrosillo.
Madame de Montespan: Lysa Ansaldi.
Cardinal Mazarin: Jack Morgan.
Anne of Austria: Marie Lenoir.

Songs

Acte I
1 Prélude versaillais - instrumental
2 Contre ceux d'en haut - M. Rim feat. V. Petrosillo
3 Qu'avons-nous fait de vous ? - V. Petrosillo feat. M. Rim
4 Je serai lui - C. Andria
5 Être à la hauteur - E. Moire
6 Ça marche - C. Maé
7 Où ça mène quand on s'aime - A.-L. Girbal, E. Moire
8 Encore du temps - V. Petrosillo, A.-L. Girbal
9 Requien Aeternam - V. Petrosillo, M. Rim, A.-L. Girbal
10 A qui la faute - C. Maé
11 Je fais de toi mon essentiel - E. Moire feat. A.-L. Girbal
12 S'aimer est interdit - A.-L. Girbal, E. Moire

Acte 2
1 Repartir - M. Rim, V. Petrosillo, C. Andria
2 Le ballet des planètes - instrumental
3 Pour arriver à moi - E. Moire
4 Un geste de vous - L. Ansaldi, C. Maé feat. E.Moire
5 Le bal des monstres - instrumental
6 Entre ciel et terre - M. Rim, V. Petrosillo
7 Alors d'accord - C. Andria with child
8 J'en appelle - L. Ansaldi
9 L'arrestation - instrumental
10 Personne n'est personne - V. Petrosillo, C. Andria
11 Et vice Versailles - C. Maé feat. E. Moire
12 La vie passe - E. Moire, C. Andria
13 Tant qu'on rêve encore - The entire cast

International productions

Japan
Presented by the all-female Takarazuka Revue, the production was performed by Star Troupe, starring Reon Yuzuki as Louis XIV. The musical ran from 17 May to 2 June 2014 at Tokyu Theatre Orb in Tokyo.

References

External links

Official Site of Le Roi Soleil (Not available anymore)
Photos of play
Photos of Anne-Laure Girbal

Theatre in Paris
2005 musicals
Works about Louis XIV
French musicals
Cultural depictions of Cardinal Mazarin